Long Branch Loop is the westernmost stop on the longest Toronto Transit Commission (TTC) streetcar route, the 501 Queen line. It is located in the Long Branch neighbourhood in southwestern Toronto, close to the boundary with Mississauga.

Westbound streetcars enter the turning loop from Lake Shore Boulevard and turn counter clockwise to face east on the north side of the platform. Bus bays are on the opposite south side of the platform with a shelter building in the centre, which once provided washrooms and a waiting room for the public.

History

The Toronto and Mimico Electric Railway and Light Company operated radial railway service along Lake Shore Boulevard originally as a single track line, with sidings to allow vehicles going in opposite directions to pass each other. The TTC double-tracked the route, and first operated a loop at Long Branch on December 28, 1928.

The TTC has used the loop as an interchange point with buses since at least 1935, when the widening of Lakeshore Road west of Etobicoke Creek required the removal of the single-track service to Port Credit. The TTC replaced the streetcar route with the 74 Port Credit bus route, which ran until 1976, when the service was taken over by the newly created Mississauga Transit.
Other historic TTC bus routes that terminated at the Long Branch loop included 69 Queensway and  87 West Mall.

In 1967, Long Branch GO Station was opened on the adjacent Lakeshore West railway line; service is available as far west as Hamilton or east to the downtown Union Station hub.

The TTC operated a separate Long Branch line between the Long Branch and Humber Loops up until 1994, and when that line was merged with the Beach route to form the 501 Queen line, the Long Branch Loop became the terminus of the longest streetcar line in North America.

In 2011, the Canadian Broadcasting Corporation broadcast a 14-minute semi-autobiographical short film entitled Long Branch. The film shows two strangers, who were about to share a one-night stand have their plans fall apart, as the distance to the Long Branch loop was too far, and they had too much time to talk to each other first. The film-makers were a couple, and one member of the film-making couple lived at the Long Branch loop and said his partner routinely declined to come home with him because of the distance.

Bus service
The loop is the terminus for TTC bus routes 110 Islington South to Islington subway station and 123 Sherway to Kipling subway station, and MiWay bus routes 5 Dixie north to Mississauga's Northeast Employment District and 23 Lakeshore west to Clarkson GO Station.

Route 110A operates via Browns Line, Horner and Islington Avenue, with 110B being a weekday rush hour only service that operates via 30th Street, which is through the local industrial area just east of Browns Line. Route 123B operates via Browns Line, Sherway Gardens mall, the East Mall and Shorncliffe; while 123C provides service via Sherway mall and North Queen Street.

References

External links

Toronto streetcar loops
Railway stations opened in 1928